Dru Rock is a rocky island  long between Retour Island and Claquebue Island in the Curzon Islands. The island is home to many craggy rock faces, which make climbing difficult.

Charting 
It was initially charted in 1951 by the French Antarctic Expedition. The island was named by them "Rocher des Drus" or "Dru Rock" in memory of their scaling of the needle-shaped peaks of Chamonix, France, "dru" being a local word for threatening. The Advisory Committee on Antarctic Names transferred the French name to English in 1962.

References 

Islands of Adélie Land